The 2007–08 Macedonian Second Football League was the sixteenth season since its establishment. It began on 4 August 2007 and ended on 1 June 2008.

Participating teams

League table

Results

Promotion playoff

Relegation playoff

See also
2007–08 Macedonian Football Cup
2007–08 Macedonian First Football League

References

External links
Football Federation of Macedonia
MacedonianFootball.com

Macedonia 2
2
Macedonian Second Football League seasons